Desert farming is the practice of developing agriculture in deserts.  As agriculture depends upon irrigation and water supply, farming in arid regions where water is scarce is a challenge.  However, desert farming has been practiced by humans for thousands of years.  In the Negev, there is evidence to suggest agriculture as far back as 5000 BC.  Today, the Imperial Valley in southern California, Australia, Saudi Arabia, Israel and Palestine are examples of modern desert agriculture.  Water efficiency has been important to the growth of desert agriculture.  Water reuse, desalination, and drip irrigation are all modern ways that regions and countries have expanded their agriculture despite being in an arid climate.

History  

Humans have been practicing and refining agriculture for millennia.  Many of the earliest civilizations such as ancient Assyria, Ancient Egypt, and the Indus Valley Civilization were founded in irrigated regions surrounded by desert.  As these civilizations grew, the ability to rear crops in the desert became of increasing importance.  There are also instances of civilizations that subsisted primarily in the desert with little irrigation or rainfall, such as various western American Indian tribes.

Native Americans 
The Native Americans practicing this agriculture included the ancient and no longer present Anasazi, the long-present Hopi, the Tewa people, Zuni people, and many other regional tribes, including the relatively recently arriving (about 1000 to 1400 CE) Navajo. These various tribes were characterized generally by the Spanish occupiers of the region as Sinagua Indians, sinagua meaning "without water", although this term is not applied to the modern Native Americans of the region.

Owing to the great dependence upon weather, an element considered to be beyond human control, substantial religious beliefs, rites, and prayer evolved around the growing of crops, and in particular the growing of the four principal corn types of the region, characterized by their colors: red, yellow, blue, and white. The presence of corn as a spiritual symbol can often be seen in the hands of the "Yeh" spirit figures represented in Navajo carpets, in the rituals associated with the "Corn Maiden" and other kachinas of the Hopi, and in various fetish objects of tribes of the region.

American Indians in the Sonoran Desert and elsewhere relied both on irrigation and "Ak-Chin" farming—a type of farming that depended on "washes" (the seasonal flood plains by winter snows and summer rains). The Ak-Chin people employed this natural form of irrigation by planting downslope from a wash, allowing floodwaters to slide over their crops.

In the Salt River Valley, now characterized by Maricopa County, Arizona, a vast canal system was created and maintained from about 600 AD to 1450 AD. Several hundred miles of canals fed crops of the area surrounding Phoenix, Tempe, Chandler and Mesa, Arizona. Unfortunately, the intense irrigation increased the salinity of the topsoil, making it no longer fit for the growing of crops. This seems to have contributed to the abandonment of the canals and the adoption of Ak-Chin farming.

The ancient canals served as a model for modern irrigation engineers, with the earliest "modern" historic canals being formed largely by cleaning out the Hohokam canals or being laid out over the top of ancient canals. The ancient ruins and canals of the Hohokam Indians were a source of pride to the early settlers who envisioned their new agricultural society rising as the mythical phoenix bird from the ashes of Hohokam society, hence the name Phoenix, Arizona. The system is especially impressive because it was built without the use of metal implements or the wheel. It took remarkable knowledge of geography and hydrology for ancient engineers to lay out the canals, but it also took remarkable socio-political organization to plan workforce deployment, including meeting the physical needs of laborers and their families as well as maintaining and administering the water resources.

Contemporary desert farming 
Desert agriculture is more important than ever before as global population rises. Countries and regions that are not water-secure are no exception to increasing population and thus increasing demand for food.  The Middle East and North Africa is perhaps the largest example of growing nations with little to no water security or food security. By 2025, it is estimated that 1.8 billion people will live in countries or regions with absolute water scarcity.

Israel 

Agriculture in modern-day Israel has pioneered several techniques for desert agriculture. The invention of drip irrigation by Simcha Blass has led to a large expansion of agriculture in arid regions, and in many places drip irrigation is the de facto irrigation technique utilized. Studies have consistently shown large water use reduction with drip irrigation or fertigation, with one study returning an 80% decrease in water use and 100% increase in crop yields. The same study (conducted on a sub-Saharan African village) found that this resulted in an improvement in the standard of living in the village by 80%.

Another hurdle for many water-scarce nations is consumption of water. Israel has chosen to take a focus on wastewater reuse to combat losing its water resources.  The small desert nation reuses 86% of its wastewater as of 2011, and 40% of the total water used by agriculture was reclaimed wastewater. Desalination, brackish, or effluent water also accounts for 44% of Israel's water supply, and the world's largest seawater desalination plant is the Sorek Desalination Plant located in Tel Aviv. The plant is able to produce 624,000 m3 of water per day.

The agricultural output of Israel has increased sevenfold since the country's independence in 1948, and total farmland has increased from 165,000 hectares to 420,000 hectares.  The country produces 70% of its own food (in dollar value).

Imperial Valley 
The Imperial Valley is a valley in the Sonoran Desert that has been farmed for 90 years in southern California. Prior to the 20th century, the valley was unsettled except for a few small settlements in the 19th century. It is supplied with water via the All-American Canal, a canal from the Colorado River. It is estimated that around 2/3 of vegetables consumed in the winter in the United States originate from the Imperial Valley. Imperial County is responsible for the most lamb and sheep production in the country.

Australia 

Despite Australia being a vastly arid nation, agriculture has been a staple of the Australian economy since its founding. Australia produces cattle, wheat, milk, wool, barley, poultry, lamb, sugar cane, fruits, nuts, and vegetables. Agriculture provides 2.2% of Australia's total employment, and 47% of the total area in Australia is occupied by farms or stations.

See also
Agriculture in the prehistoric Southwest
Arid-zone agriculture
Desert greening
Dryland farming 
Solar desalination
Agriculture in Israel
Agriculture in Australia
Ancient Egyptian agriculture

Notes

External links and further reading
 O'Bar, Scott, (2013). Alternative Crops for Drylands – Proactively Adapting to Climate Change and Water Shortages. Amaigabe Press, Santa Barbara, CA 
 P. Koohafkan and B.A. Stewart, Water and Cereals in Drylands published by The Food and Agriculture Organization of the United Nations and Earthscan
Water and Cereals in Drylands

Agriculture by type
Agriculture by region